The Transporter Refueled (French: Le Transporteur: Héritage; also known as Transporter 4) is a 2015 action thriller film directed by Camille Delamarre and written by Bill Collage, Adam Cooper, and Luc Besson. It serves as a reboot and the fourth film in the Transporter franchise. It stars Ed Skrein as Frank Martin, alongside Ray Stevenson, Loan Chabanol, Gabriella Wright, Tatjana Pajković, Wenxia Yu, Radivoje Bukvić, Lenn Kudrjawizki, Anatole Taubman, and Noémie Lenoir. In the film, Frank finds himself caught up in a bank heist and kidnapping plot orchestrated by Anna (Chabanol).

A fourth Transporter film was planned to feature original franchise star Jason Statham, who was offered a three film deal with EuropaCorp to produce additional installments. After negotiations with Statham fell through, Skrein was hired and the franchise was rebooted, featuring no returning cast members from the first three films. Principal photography took place in Paris.

The Transporter Refueled was theatrically released on 4 September 2015 in the United States and in France five days later, by EuropaCorp; it is the first Transporter film primarily distributed by EuropaCorp. The film received negative reviews from critics, who criticzed the screenplay and found it underwhelming compared to other Transporter films. It grossed $72 million worldwide.

Plot

Former special-operations mercenary Frank Martin is living a less perilous lifestyle than he had previously, transporting classified packages for questionable people. Then he takes the contract from Anna following his three rules of no names, no questions and no renegotiations. According to the contract, he should be near the bank for her and her two packages. However, he finds himself thrust into danger again when Anna and her accomplices Gina, Maria, and Qiao orchestrate a bank robbery and kidnap Martin's father to confront and kill Arkady Karasov, a Russian mobster who had victimized Anna years earlier. Anna's whole team rob Arkady's friends and frame him for it.

Cast
 Ed Skrein as Frank Martin Jr., a former mercenary turned contract driver, known mainly as the Transporter.
 Ray Stevenson as Frank Martin Sr., a retired secret agent and Frank's father
 Loan Chabanol as Anna, one of four runaway sex slaves who wants to take revenge on Karasov for an event 15 years prior to the events of the film.
 Gabriella Wright as Gina, Anna's friend and another one of four runaway sex slaves who set out against Karasov
 Tatjana Pajković as Maria, Anna's friend and another one of four runaway sex slaves
 Yu Wenxia as Qiao, Anna's friend and another one of the four runaway sex slaves
  as Arkady Karasov, a powerful Russian mobster who kidnapped Frank's father, as well as Frank's former brother-in-arms and was responsible for the event that occurred 15 years prior to the events of the film, which involved Anna and her friends.
 Noémie Lenoir as Maissa
 Lenn Kudrjawizki as Leo Imasov, the second person on Anna's hitlist for robbing their banks, who host nightclub dance parties.
 Yuri Kolokolnikov as Yuri, a third person on Anna's hitlist for robbing their banks, and he owns a plane.
 Samir Guesmi as Inspector Bectaoui
 Anatole Taubman as Stanislav Turgin

Production
At the 2013 Cannes Film Festival, a new trilogy was announced with EuropaCorp and China's Fundamental Films co-producing and distributing the titles. The films will likely be budgeted between €25 million and €30 million each and at least one will be shot in China. Luc Besson will co-finance, distribute, produce and write all the films. The franchise was rebooted after negotiations with Jason Statham fell through.

EuropaCorp wanted Statham to sign a three contract deal, without revealing the script first. English actor Ed Skrein replaced Statham as Frank Martin in the fourth installment of the series. In March 2015, the title was changed from The Transporter Legacy to The Transporter Refueled.

Principal photography of the film began on 1 August 2014, in Paris, France.

Release
The film was previously set to be released on 6 March 2015. On 5 November 2014, EuropaCorp moved the film for a 19 June 2015 release. On 1 April 2015, EuropaCorp again moved the film back to a 4 September 2015.

Box office

In its opening weekend in North America, the film grossed $7.4 million, finishing 4th at the box office. It was also 4th on its opening weekend in China, grossing .

Critical response

The Transporter Refueled has received negative reviews from critics. On Rotten Tomatoes, the film has a rating of 16%, based on 94 reviews, with an average rating of 3.8/10. The site's critical consensus reads, "The Transporter Refueled has little to offer beyond a handful of decent action sequences, leaving this reboot's title feeling more like wishful thinking than a restatement of purpose." On Metacritic the film has a score of 32 out of 100, based on 24 critics, indicating "generally unfavorable reviews". On CinemaScore, audiences gave the film an average grade of "B−" on an A+ to F scale.

IGN awarded it a score of 7.0 out of 10, saying, "The shadow of Jason Statham loomed large over this reboot, but Ed Skrein nails it, meaning the franchise is in safe hands."

References

External links
 
 
 
 

Transporter (franchise)
2015 films
Belgian action thriller films
2015 action thriller films
French action thriller films
Chinese action thriller films
2010s chase films
Films about organized crime in France
Films about race and ethnicity
Films about prostitution
Films set in 1995
Films set in 2010
Films set in Monaco
Films set in Paris
Films shot in Monaco
Films shot in Paris
Films produced by Luc Besson
Mafia films
Reboot films
IMAX films
TF1 Films Production films
Canal+ films
EuropaCorp films
Fundamental Films films
English-language French films
English-language Chinese films
English-language Belgian films
Films with screenplays by Luc Besson
2010s English-language films
French prequel films
Chinese prequel films
Belgian prequel films
2010s French films